Hypena decorata, the decorated hypena, is a species of moth in the family Erebidae. It is found in North America.

The MONA or Hodges number for Hypena decorata is 8463.

References

Further reading

 
 
 

decorata
Articles created by Qbugbot
Moths described in 1884